Temnothorax zabelini is a species of ant in the genus Temnothorax, that is native to Turkmenistan.

References

External links

Myrmicinae
Hymenoptera of Asia
Insects of Central Asia
Endemic fauna of Turkmenistan
Insects described in 1989
Taxonomy articles created by Polbot
Taxobox binomials not recognized by IUCN